Crimes and misdemeanors (or misdemeanours) may refer to:

 Crimes and Misdemeanors, 1989 film by Woody Allen
 High crimes and misdemeanours, a judicial term